Condylolomia participalis, the drab condylolomia moth, is a species of snout moth in the genus Condylolomia. It was described by Augustus Radcliffe Grote in 1873. It is found in eastern North America, from southern Quebec to North Carolina, west to Nebraska and Minnesota.

Larvae have been found inside rolled leaftips of Myrica gale.

References

Moths described in 1873
Chrysauginae